NYC & Company is New York City’s official marketing, tourism and partnership organization. The not-for-profit quasi-agency's mission is to maximize opportunities for travel and tourism in New York City, build economic prosperity and spread the dynamic image of New York City around the world.

Leadership 
 Charles Flateman, Chairperson of the Board of Directors of NYC & Company
 Fred Dixon, President and CEO of NYC & Company

References

External links
 

Companies based in New York City
Tourism agencies
Tourism in New York City